The  is the eastern terminus of the Aomori Expressway, a two-lane national expressway in Aomori, Aomori Prefecture, Japan. It is owned and operated by East Nippon Expressway Company. There is no toll gate at the interchange; drivers pay to use the end of the expressway at the Aomori Chuo Toll Gate.

References

Road interchanges in Japan
Roads in Aomori Prefecture